The Citizens' Assembly on Electoral Reform was created by the government of British Columbia, Canada to investigate changes to the provincial electoral system. On October 25, 2004, it proposed replacing the province's existing first past the post (FPTP) system with BC-STV, a single transferable vote (STV) system. This recommendation was put to the electorate-at-large in a referendum held concurrently with the 2005 provincial election. In order for the results to be binding, the referendum required a super-majority including approval by 60% of voters overall and simple majorities in 60% of the 79 districts in order to pass. In the event, the second of these thresholds was easily met, with a majority supporting the reform in 77 out of 79 electoral districts, but the overall vote fell short of the 60% requirement, with 57.69% of the votes in favour.
 
Another referendum on adopting the STV system was held and defeated during BC's 2009 provincial election.  The referendum passed in only 8 electoral districts, and only 39.09% of the electorate voted in favour of it.

History
During the 2001 provincial election, the Liberal Party promised to create a citizens' assembly to consider changes to the provincial electoral system (as opposed to forming a Royal Commission, as New Zealand did). The recommendation of the assembly would then be put as a referendum. In December 2002, Gordon Gibson submitted his report, recommending an assembly composed of randomly selected citizens, two from each of the province's 79 electoral districts.  In May 2003, the Legislature unanimously adopted the concept and most of the details.

Selection process

Counting the chair, the BC Citizens' Assembly on Electoral Reform was composed of 161 members: one man and one woman randomly selected from each of BC's 79 electoral districts, two Aboriginal members and a chair. Assembly members were selected by a civic lottery that ensured a gender balance and fair representation by age group and the geographical distribution of the population.

Selection of members for the Assembly involved a three-stage process:
 Stage one began in August 2003 when 15,800 invitations were mailed to randomly identified British Columbians. To ensure even geographical representation, 200 invitations were extended in each constituency. Invitees were asked if they were willing to put their names into a draw for future candidacy.
 In stage two, the names of respondents expressing interest went into a pool for their constituency. Positive respondents were organized into 79 groups of 20, with some structuring to ensure an even split between men and women and reflect the age distribution of individuals in the constituency. These candidates were then invited to information meetings where they heard presentations about the Assembly and were asked to publicly confirm their eligibility and interest in participating.
 In stage three, the names of those who responded positively were sealed into envelopes and entered into a final draw. Two people from each district pool, one man and one woman, were selected by random draw for membership in the Citizens' Assembly. Selection into the Assembly continued until December 2003.  Two additional members, representing First Nations communities, were added after the selection of the original 158.

Assembly proceedings

From January to May 2004, the Assembly went through a 12-week "Learning Phase" involving presentations by experts, group discussions and access to a range of source materials. Work included a review of different electoral systems in usage around the world and their various effects on the political process.

This was followed by a public consultation phase lasting from May to June. Assembly members held over 50 public hearings and received a total of 1603 written submissions.

Between September and October 2004, the members deliberated over which electoral system to recommend, emphasizing three values deemed most important: fairness of representation, local representation and voter choice. Among the alternatives considered were a Mixed Member Proportional system (MMP) and an STV system.

On October 23 and 24, 2004, the Assembly voted on different options in three separate votes. A first vote asked members to express their preference for MMP or STV. This vote yielded a strong, but not unanimous preference for STV: 123 votes for STV vs. 31 for MMP. Members then voted between retaining FPTP or moving to STV. There was a strong preference for STV: 142 votes for STV vs. 11 for retaining FPTP. Finally, the Assembly voted in favour of submitting a recommendation in favour of STV to the public in a referendum on May 17, 2005: 146 in favour vs. 7 against.

On December 10, the Assembly's final report, titled "Making Every Vote Count: The Case for Electoral Reform in British Columbia" was presented to the B.C. legislature by the Assembly. It recommended changing the electoral system to a localized version of STV called BC-STV. A separate final report on the work of the Assembly was submitted to the legislature by the Special Committee on the Citizens' Assembly on Electoral Reform in February 2005.

See also
Citizens' Assembly on Electoral Reform (Ontario)
Citizens' Reference Panel

References

Further reading
P. Fournier, H. van der Kolk, R. K. Carty, A. Blais, and J. Rose, When citizens decide. Lessons from Citizen Assemblies on Electoral Reform (Oxford University Press, 2011). 
R. B. Herath, Real Power to the People: A Novel Approach to Electoral Reform in British Columbia (University Press of America, 2007)
M. E. Warren and H. Pearse, eds., Designing Deliberative Democracy: The British Columbia Citizens' Assembly (Cambridge University Press, 2008).

External links
Report of the Citizens' Assembly (Archived by UBC)
British Columbia Citizens' Assembly on Electoral Reform Website (2004)
The "Know STV" Campaign (urged 'no' vote)
Simulation of BC elections using STV boundaries
Records of Citizens' Assembly on Electoral Reform are held by Simon Fraser University's Special Collections and Rare Books

2003 establishments in British Columbia
Electoral Reform (British Columbia)
Politics of British Columbia
History and use of electoral systems
Electoral reform in Canada